Black Dalia is a 2009 Indian Malayalam film directed by Baburaj in his directorial debut. The film stars Suresh Gopi, Vani Viswanath and Baburaj with Cherrie Minhas, Tami Dushyantha, Suja Naidu, Teena Ponnamma, Ruksha, Jisna Ali, Althara, Kavitha Nair, Pavithra and Thegika in other important roles. This film was dubbed in Telugu as Anthima Theerpu,

Plot
A student of Sacred Heart Medical College is found murdered in mysterious circumstances. Police begin the investigation but soon two more girls are found murdered in the college campus. Daisy Wilfred IPS (Vani Viswanath) takes charge of the investigation.

Cast

 Suresh Gopi as Dr. Aadikesavan 
 Vani Viswanath as DIG Daisy Wilfred IPS
 Baburaj as CI Anwar Ali
 Sai Kumar as Sirajuddin
 Jagathy Sreekumar
 Vijayaraghavan as IG Mathew K. John IPS
 Devan as Raveendren
 Arun as Vivek Aravindakshan
 Abu Salim
 Kollam Thulasi as Kariyachan
 Sadiq as James
 Saju Kodiyan
 Seema
 Kalasala Babu as Sibi Kuruvila
 Urmila Unni
 Geetha Vijayan
 Mythili Roy as Dalia
 Anil Murali as Alex
 Nawab Shah as Robert
 Pavithra as Linda Disuza
 Suja Naidu as Jessica
 Tami Dushyantha as Sameera Daniel
 Teena Ponnamma as Srada C.K.
 Ruksha as Maria Mary John
 Jisna Ali as Rashida
 Althara as Aathira Nair
 Kavitha Nair as Jasmine
 Thegika as Avanthika 
 Cherrie Minhas as Samantha 
 Gomathy Mahadevan as Dr.Sherly Thomas
 Lakshmi Gopalaswamy
 Chali Pala as DYSP Ramachandran Kurup
 Nishan K. P. Nanaiah
 Shritha Sivadas

Reception 

Sify.com wrote "It may not have the kind of finesse or the brilliance that is seen in many of the well-taken mystery thrillers, but still this one can easily be classified as a watchable fare. Go without much expectation and chances are that you may find it enjoyable." Paresh C Palicha from Rediff.com wrote "Suresh Gopi appears sincere in the couple of scenes he is allotted, as if he is carrying the film on his shoulders. Vani Vishvanath gets a big chunk of screen-time and she devours it. Babu Raj is good as the bad guy, the subordinate of Vani Vishvanath. However, the final verdict is that this Black Dahlia withers away before it can even blossom"

See also
 Malayalam films of 2009

References

External links
 

2009 films
2000s Malayalam-language films
2009 directorial debut films